Paola Paternoster (née Carotenuto; 22 December 1935 – 27 June 2018) was an Italian athlete. She competed in the discus throw at the 1956 and 1960 Summer Olympics and in the javelin throw in 1956, and placed 11th–20th.

Career
Multipurpose athlete, she has won 17 national titles in five different disciplines (high jump, shot put, discus throw, javelin throw and pentathlon). She participated in two editions of the Olympic Games: Melbourne 1956 and Rome 1960.

National records
 High jump: 1.62 m  Naples, 26 June 1956), till 14 September 1957
 Shot put: 14.38 m  Rome, 28 March 1959), till 27 June 1965
 Discus throw: 51.33 m  Rome, 27 March 1960), till 17 June 1965
 Javelin throw: 47.96 m  Bucharest, 23 June 1957), till 11 September 1970

National titles

Paternoster won 17 national championships at the senior level,

High jump: 1955 (1)
Shot put: 1955, 1956, 1957, 1958, 1960 (5)
Discus throw: 1955, 1956, 1957 (3)
Javelin throw: 1956, 1957, 1959, 1960, 1961 (5)
Pentathlon: 1954, 1955, 1956 (3)

See also
Women's high jump Italian record progression

References

External links
 

1935 births
2018 deaths
Athletes (track and field) at the 1956 Summer Olympics
Athletes (track and field) at the 1960 Summer Olympics
Olympic athletes of Italy
Italian female discus throwers
Italian female javelin throwers
Italian female pentathletes
Athletes from Rome
20th-century Italian women